Chitl is a rural locality (a selo) in Gumbetovsky District, Republic of Dagestan, Russia. The population was 578 as of 2010. There are 12 streets.

Geography 
Chitl is located 36 km south of Mekhelta (the district's administrative centre) by road. Verkhneye Inkho and Nizhneye Inkho are the nearest rural localities.

References 

Rural localities in Gumbetovsky District